The Citabria is a light single-engine, two-seat, fixed conventional gear airplane which entered production in the United States in 1964.  Designed for flight training, utility and personal use, it is capable of sustaining aerobatic stresses from +5g to -2g.  Its name spelled backwards, "airbatic", reflects this.

Production history
The Citabria was designed and initially produced by Champion Aircraft Corporation, and was a derivative of designs the company had been building since acquiring the 7-series Champ from Aeronca in 1954.  The model 7ECA Citabria entered production at Champion in 1964.  The 7GCAA and 7GCBC variants, added in 1965, were joined by the 7KCAB in 1968.

In 1970, Champion was acquired by Bellanca Aircraft Corporation, which continued production of all of the Champion-designed variants.  Bellanca introduced two designs with close connections to the Citabria:  The 8KCAB Decathlon and the 8GCBC Scout.  Production at Bellanca ended in 1980 and the company's assets were liquidated in 1982.

The Citabria designs passed through the hands of a number of companies through the 1980s, including a Champion Aircraft Company which was no relation to the Champion Aircraft of the 1960s.  In that period, only one Citabria model was built—a 7GCBC marketed as "Citabria 150S."  American Champion Aircraft Corporation acquired the Citabria, Decathlon, and Scout designs in 1989 and returned the 7ECA, 7GCAA, and 7GCBC models to production over a period of years.

Design
The Citabria traces its lineage back to the Champ.  The most noticeable external changes to the design are the Citabria's squared-off rudder surface, wingtips, and rear windows.  Like the Champ, the Citabria features tandem seating.  The fuselage and tail surfaces are constructed of welded metal tubing.  The outer shape of the fuselage is created by a combination of wooden formers and longerons, covered with fabric.  The cross-section of the metal fuselage truss is triangular, a design feature which can be traced all the way back to the earliest Aeronca C-2 design of the late 1920s.

The strut-braced wings of the Citabria are, like the fuselage and tail surfaces, fabric covered, utilizing aluminum ribs.  Most Citabrias were built with wooden spars.  American Champion has been using aluminum spars in the aircraft it has produced and has, as well, made the aluminum-spar wings available for retrofit installation on older aircraft.

The landing gear of the Citabria is in a conventional arrangement.  The main gear legs of most Citabrias are made of spring steel, though American Champion began to use aluminum gear legs in 2004.  Early Citabrias were fitted with a steel tube main gear which uses an oleo strut for shock absorption.  All of the variants are discussed in more detail below.

Operational history

When the Citabria was introduced, it was the only airplane being commercially produced in the United States which was certified for aerobatics. Citabrias were also popular as trainers—because of their conventional gear and their aerobatic capabilities—and as personal aircraft.  They were also found in utility roles as bush planes—thanks to their short take off and landing (STOL) ability, agriculture, pipeline patrol, and as glider towplanes.  Though variants of the design, and other better-suited designs have largely taken over the Citabria's utility roles, Citabrias remain popular as trainers, glider towplanes, and for personal use.

Variants

7ECA, Citabria Standard, Citabria Aurora

When introduced, it featured wood-spar wings and oleo-shock main gear. In 1967, Champion switched to spring steel main gear legs; by then, the Lycoming engine had become the standard. On acquiring the design, Bellanca gave this model the name Citabria "Standard" and began using the  Lycoming O-235-K2C engine. When American Champion reintroduced the 7ECA in 1995 as the Citabria "Aurora, " the biggest change was the use of metal-spar wings; the most recent significant design change has been the switch to aluminum main gear legs in 2004.

7GCAA, Citabria 150, Citabria "A" Package, Citabria Adventure

Introduced in 1965, the Champion 7GCAA, like the 7ECA, featured wood-spar wings and oleo-shock main gear. Champion switched to spring steel main gear legs in 1967. Bellanca continued production of the 7GCAA as the Citabria "A" Package (a designation apparently begun by Champion), but with no significant design changes.

7GCBC, Citabria 150s, Citabria "C" Package, Citabria Explorer

Champion introduced the 7GCBC in 1965. Bellanca continued production of the 7GCBC, calling it the Citabria "C" Package (a designation apparently begun by Champion).

7KCAB, Citabria "B" Package

Champion introduced the 7KCAB in 1968. It was substantially similar to the 7GCAA of the same year, with wood-spar wings and spring steel main gear legs. The major differences between the 7GCAA and 7KCAB were in the fuel system and the engine oil system. In addition, the carburetor was replaced with a fuel injection system, and a Christen Industries inverted oil system was fitted to the engine. All of these changes were made in order to allow for extended inverted flight, a mode not possible in the earlier models. Bellanca continued production of the 7KCAB as the Citabria "B" Package (a designation apparently begun by Champion).

Citabria Pro
The 8KCAB Citabria Pro was first flown by Champion on 2 August 1968, and was a dedicated aerobatic aircraft based on the standard Citabria. It was a parasol winged monoplane, with a revised wing section and a longer fuselage. The prototype had an open cockpit for a single pilot, but the design allowed for conversion to a two seat layout. The aircraft was powered by a  Lycoming IO-360 Special engine driving a two-bladed propeller. It was never put into production at Champion nor by Bellanca which acquired the company and designs only a short time later.

Military operators
The 7GCBC Citabria was used as an observation aircraft by the Turkish Army.  One of these aircraft is displayed at the Rahmi M Koç Museum in Istanbul.

Turkish Army

Tongan Maritime Force Air Force

Specifications (7GCAA Citabria)

See also

References

Aircraft specification no. A-759.  Revision 67.  (Jun. 3, 2005.)  Department of Transportation.  Federal Aviation Administration.

External links

 American Champion Aircraft Corporation

1960s United States civil utility aircraft
1960s United States civil trainer aircraft
1960s United States sport aircraft
Citabria
Citabria
Citabria
Glider tugs
Aerobatic aircraft
Single-engined tractor aircraft
High-wing aircraft
Aircraft first flown in 1964